Where the Line Bleeds is the debut novel by American writer Jesmyn Ward. It was published in 2008 by Scribner.

Background and publication history
Ward had difficulty finding a publisher for the novel. Between this and the low pay she received from her job as a composition instructor, Ward considered abandoning writing to pursue a career in nursing. Before pursuing a different career, Doug Siebold of Agate Publishing accepted the novel, and the company published it in 2008. Shortly after, Ward was awarded a Stegner Fellowship which allowed her to continue writing. The book was reissued by Scribner in 2018.

Some of the characters from the novel have later appeared in other books by Ward.

Plot
Where the Line Bleeds follows twin brothers, Joshua and Christophe, who are raised by their blind grandmother, and have just graduated from high school on the Gulf Coast of Mississippi. Poor and Black, they find few economic opportunities as they struggle to undertake their adult lives.

Reception

Critical reception
The novel received positive reviews. Reviews from Kirkus Reviews and Publishers Weekly  praised the novel as a strong debut. In the Austin Chronicle, Elizabeth Jackson compared Ward's style to William Faulkner and noted the potential in “a female, black author invoking the (white) father of Southern letters to explore the world of a poor, rural, black family”, calling it “an exciting proposition, with original and subversive implications”. However, Jackson expresses some reservation, saying Ward's potential remains just that—potential, with some overwritten scenes that Jackson anticipates will improve in future work—but nevertheless says “this reviewer would rather read such a distinctive voice portraying an underexplored landscape than another white author talking about ivory-tower malaise, any day.”

Honors
The novel was shortlisted for the First Novelist Award and the Hurston-Wright Legacy Award.

References

2008 American novels
2008 debut novels
Novels set in the United States
African-American novels
Literature by African-American women